Khalifa Karouane (1937 – before 1998) was a Moroccan wrestler. He competed in the men's Greco-Roman 57 kg at the 1968 Summer Olympics.

References

External links
 

1937 births
Year of death missing
Moroccan male sport wrestlers
Olympic wrestlers of Morocco
Wrestlers at the 1968 Summer Olympics
Sportspeople from Casablanca
20th-century Moroccan people